Molly's Shoes is an original stage production written by Alex Vickery-Howe. It was commissioned by the Independent Arts Foundation through Carclew Youth Arts and first staged by Accidental Productions at the Bakehouse Theatre in Adelaide, South Australia from May to July 2011.

The title refers to "shoes young people often try to fill."

Plot 
Molly's Shoes depicts a narrative split across time. Physics students David Moss and Elspeth Straun fall in love between 1997 and 1999 but their relationship fractures into the new millennium as their belief systems begin to clash under the critical eye of their senior lecturer, Professor Molly Taffy. In the near future, an older David and Elspeth are reunited in time to watch Molly degenerate into Alzheimer's, forced to make ethical decisions as the moment dictates.

ACT I – CLINGING TO A GRAIN OF SAND

David Moss begins his first year studies, as a science enthusiast and self-confessed geek. Early in his first week he meets Elspeth Straun. There is chemistry between the two students, despite Elspeth's fiery temper and spontaneous, live-for-the-moment edge occasionally clashing with David's self-consciously analytical worldview.

Their lecturer, acid-tongued Molly Taffy, goads David into reaching his full potential as a student, accidentally setting him on a path of religious investigation and putting him at odds with Elspeth.

The climax comes with the sudden suicide of Molly's husband and her rejection of her now indoctrinated pupil, as well as the split between the young David and Elspeth.

In the present, an older David nurses a frail Molly, and awaits Elspeth's return to his life.

ACT II – ROSE COLOURED SKY

Elspeth, now in her early 40s, arrives at David's doorstep, to assist him in caring for Molly. The two rekindle their old flame, as Molly slips further away from reality.

David's motivation for calling Elspeth is revealed; he wants to end Molly's suffering and needs Elspeth, the non-believer, to do it. When she rejects him, David is forced to explore his personal ethics.

The past reaches into the present as the older David is confronted by the memories of the younger Elspeth and younger Molly, bringing him to his final decision.

The play explores the concepts we cling to – academia, religion, love – in order to define the world and our own place in it, ultimately presenting a world without clear answers save those we make for ourselves.

Style 

Molly's Shoes is a piece of contemporary theatre that employs surrealism, theatrical illusion and direct address. Characters frequently break the fourth wall to convey their feelings to the audience and the action alternates between time periods, creating parallel narratives. The scenes are short and the dialogue is fast-paced.

Original production

Cast and crew
The cast of the original production in South Australia included:
 David Moss: Tim Smith / John Maurice
 Elspeth Straun: Rachel Jones / Joanne Hartstone
 Molly Taffy: Katie O'Reilly / Bridget Walters

The crew included:
 Director: Joh Hartog
 Designer: Tammy Boden
 Lighting: Stephen Dean

Reception
The debut production earned many positive reviews. Critic Barry Lenny from Glam Adelaide described Molly's Shoes as an "intellectually and emotionally engaging new play" that has "everything going for it", reserving special praise for Bridget Walters as the elder Molly:

The Australian declared Molly's Shoes "an impressive next step" for the company, while Aaron Nash of DB Magazine praised the cast, and pointed out that the debate between science and faith was well-balanced in the production:
 
Although the mainstream state and national press was complimentary, theatrical blogger Stephen Davenport found the show "confounding" and "an inspired, though garbled hotchpotch of themes" a view contradicted by fellow blogger Kryztoff Raw:

Jamie Wright from the online publication Adelaide Theatre Guide expressed the opposite opinion to Davenport, rather than finding it "confounding", Wright felt that the show's treatment of its core themes was simplistic:

The debut production created a great deal of debate among members of the audience. On the company's website, playwright Vickery-Howe described the extreme reactions:

The play was nominated for the Adelaide Critics' Circle Awards 2011.

References

Australian plays
2011 plays
Existentialist plays